This is a list of episodes for the CBS television series The White Shadow.

Series overview

Episodes

Season 1 (1978–79)

Season 2 (1979–80)

Season 3 (1980–81)

References

External links
 

White Shadow, The